The Kansas City Suburban Belt Railroad was a railway located throughout the suburban Kansas City area.  The railway was incorporated by Arthur Stilwell and Edward L. Martin in 1887, and began operation in 1890.  In September 1900, it was placed under the receivership control of Stuart R. Knott and Edward F. Swinney with the aim of merging the railroad into the Kansas City Southern Railway system.

References 

Predecessors of the Kansas City Southern Railway
Defunct Missouri railroads
Defunct Kansas railroads
Railway companies established in 1887
Railway companies disestablished in 1902
American companies established in 1887
American companies disestablished in 1902